, real name , was a Japanese writer and poet born in Mizuhashi (now part of Toyama City), Toyama Prefecture, Japan. She was known for her works of fiction and nonfiction about people affected by World War II.  Henmi was the daughter of Gen'yoshi Kadokawa, founder of publisher Kadokawa Shoten and the older sister of Haruki Kadokawa.

Henmi won the Nitta Jirō Culture Prize in 1984 for her 1983 book , about crew members of the Japanese battleship Yamato and their final voyage during Operation Ten-Go.  The book was later made into a 2005 movie under the same title.  Henmi also won two nonfiction literary awards for her 1989 work  about notes received 10 years after World War II by the family of a man who died in a Russian prison camp in Siberia.

Henmi died on September 21, 2011, after collapsing in her home in a Tokyo suburb.  She was 72 years old.

Notes

1939 births
2011 deaths
Waseda University alumni
Japanese non-fiction writers
People from Toyama Prefecture
20th-century Japanese novelists
21st-century Japanese novelists
Writers from Toyama Prefecture
Kadokawa Shoten